Pembe is a Macedonian circle dance (oro) from the region of Veles.

It is a mixed man and woman dance with steady movements on whole feet with a characteristic movement of the heels. The dance begins slow and speeds up toward the end. The dancers hold hands up, on a level with the shoulders. They begin their dance in a position of a half circle.

See also
Music of North Macedonia

Further reading
Dimovski, Mihailo. (1977:44-5). Macedonian folk dances (Original in Macedonian: Македонски народни ора). Skopje: Naša kniga & Institut za folklor

External links

Macedonian dances
Circle dances